Cherry Tree is a census-designated place (CDP) in Adair County, Oklahoma, United States. The population was 883 at the 2010 census, a decline of 26.5 percent from the figure of 1,202 recorded in 2000.

Geography
Cherry Tree is located at  (35.747934, -94.662736).

Demographics

As of the census of 2000, there were 1,202 people, 379 households, and 299 families residing in the CDP. The population density was 39.1 people per square mile (15.1/km2). There were 421 housing units at an average density of 13.7/sq mi (5.3/km2). The racial makeup of the CDP was 17.47% White, 0.08% African American, 75.37% Native American, 0.08% Asian, 0.50% from other races, and 6.49% from two or more races. Hispanic or Latino of any race were 2.50% of the population.

There were 379 households, out of which 38.5% had children under the age of 18 living with them, 57.0% were married couples living together, 17.4% had a female householder with no husband present, and 21.1% were non-families. 18.7% of all households were made up of individuals, and 5.8% had someone living alone who was 65 years of age or older. The average household size was 3.17 and the average family size was 3.64.

In the CDP, the population was spread out, with 32.3% under the age of 18, 9.6% from 18 to 24, 28.0% from 25 to 44, 22.3% from 45 to 64, and 7.8% who were 65 years of age or older. The median age was 31 years. For every 100 females, there were 100.3 males. For every 100 females age 18 and over, there were 98.1 males.

The median income for a household in the CDP was $26,438, and the median income for a family was $28,882. Males had a median income of $25,417 versus $18,295 for females. The per capita income for the CDP was $8,895. About 21.0% of families and 26.5% of the population were below the poverty line, including 37.3% of those under age 18 and 18.1% of those age 65 or over.

References

Census-designated places in Adair County, Oklahoma
Census-designated places in Oklahoma
Cherokee towns in Oklahoma